The 1911 William & Mary Orange and Black football team represented the College of William & Mary as a member of the Eastern Virginia Intercollegiate Athletic Association (EVIAA) during the 1911 college football season. Led by first-year head coach William J. Young, William & Mary compiled an overall record of 1–5–2 with a mark of 1–2 in conference placing third in the EVIAA.

Schedule

References

William and Mary
William & Mary Tribe football seasons
William and Mary Orange and Black football